Gerard Pieter Hendrik van Velde (born 30 November 1971) is a Dutch retired speed skater who specialised in sprinting. He won an Olympic gold medal in 2002.

Biography
Van Velde was considered the best Dutch sprinter during the early 1990s, but did not manage to win a medal in either the 1992 or 1994 Winter Olympics.  The 1992 Games were particularly frustrating, as he missed a bronze medal by only one-hundredth of a second.

During the late 1990s, clap skates became standard in Olympic competition.  Van Velde had such difficulty adjusting to the techniques required with these new skates that he retired from skating and became a car salesman.  However, he was not finished with the skating world.

Rintje Ritsma, another Dutch skater invited Van Velde to be his training partner, and, during training, he mastered the clap skate techniques. He decided to try out for the 2002 Winter Olympics, in spite of the arrival of a new generation of Dutch sprinters such as Jan Bos, Erben Wennemars and Jakko Jan Leeuwangh.  Van Velde became the fourth sprinter to qualify for the games.

In Salt Lake City, he started before all the other favorites and raced to a world record finish with a time of 1:07.18. This time he shaved more than half a second from the previous best world time, and more than a second from his personal best.  The skaters who followed were unable to best him, and he won the gold medal.

In December 2005, at the Dutch Olympic trials in Heerenveen, van Velde failed to qualify for the 2006 Winter Olympics in Turin. In retirement he became a coach.

Records

Personal records

Source: SpeedskatingResults.com

World records

Source: SpeedSkatingStats.com

Tournament overview

Source:
DQ = Disqualified
DNF = Did not finish
DNS = Did not start
NC = No classification

Medals won

References

External links
 
 PB's Gerard van Velde at SpeedskatingBase.eu with link to results International Championships
 Gerard van Velde at SpeedSkatingStats.com
 
 
 

 
 

1971 births
Living people
People from Heerde
Dutch male speed skaters
Speed skaters at the 1992 Winter Olympics
Speed skaters at the 1994 Winter Olympics
Speed skaters at the 2002 Winter Olympics
Olympic speed skaters of the Netherlands
Olympic gold medalists for the Netherlands
Olympic medalists in speed skating
World record setters in speed skating
Medalists at the 2002 Winter Olympics
World Single Distances Speed Skating Championships medalists
Dutch speed skating coaches
Dutch sports coaches
Sportspeople from Gelderland